Pershing Township may refer to one of the following places within the United States:

 Pershing Township, Jackson County, Indiana
 Pershing Township, Burt County, Nebraska

Township name disambiguation pages